Barrientos Island is a small, ice-free island in the Aitcho group on the west side of English Strait in the South Shetland Islands, Antarctica.  Extending , surface area .  The area was visited by early 19th century sealers.  Barrientos Island is a popular tourist site frequented by Antarctic cruise ships.

The feature was named by the Chilean Antarctic Expedition in 1949.

Location

See also
 Aitcho Islands
 Composite Antarctic Gazetteer
 List of Antarctic islands south of 60° S
 SCAR
 South Shetland Islands
 Territorial claims in Antarctica

References

External links
 Secretariat of the Antarctic Treaty Visitor Site Guidelines and island description 
 SCAR Composite Antarctic Gazetteer.

Islands of the South Shetland Islands
Tourism sites in Antarctica